Alicja Pawlak is a Polish football defender currently playing for Unia Racibórz in the Ekstraliga. She has played the Champions League with AZS Wrocław, where she played for a decade, and Unia.

She is a member of the Polish national team since 2005.

References

1983 births
Living people
Polish women's footballers
Place of birth missing (living people)
Women's association football defenders
Poland women's international footballers
RTP Unia Racibórz players